Kamprad is a Swedish surname. Notable people with the surname include:

Ingvar Kamprad (1926–2018), Swedish businessman
Jonas Kamprad (born 1966), Swedish businessman, son of Ingvar
Klaus-Jürgen Kamprad (born 1962), German musicologist, publisher, music producer, and editor

Swedish-language surnames